This is a list of affiliates of the Trades Union Congress, that is, member trade unions of the Trades Union Congress.

Current affiliates

Former affiliates
Affiliated unions were placed in an industrial group until 1983.  Group information is from Jack Eaton and Colin Gill (1981) The Trade Union Directory, London: Pluto Press for all unions affiliated as of 1981.  For unions which left before this date, information is from the last relevant annual report of the TUC

Mining and Quarrying

Railways
Of the unions in this section, the Associated Society of Locomotive Engineers and Firemen and the Transport Salaried Staffs' Association remaining members of the TUC.

Transport (other than railways)
Of the unions which held membership of this group, the United Road Transport Union remains a member of the TUC.

Shipbuilding

Engineering, Founding and Vehicle Building

Technical Engineering and Scientific

Electricity

Iron and Steel and Minor Metal Trades

Building, Woodworking and Furnishing

Printing and Paper
Of the unions which held membership of this section, the National Union of Journalists remains a TUC member.

Textiles

Clothing, Leather and Boot and Shoe

Glass, Ceramics, Chemicals, Food, Drink, Tobacco, Brushmaking and Distribution
Of the unions in this section, the Bakers, Food and Allied Workers' Union and the Union of Shop, Distributive and Allied Workers remain TUC members.

Agriculture

Public Employees
Of the former members of this section, the Educational Institute of Scotland, Fire Brigades Union, Hospital Consultants and Specialists Association and NASUWT remain TUC members.

Civil Servants and Post Office
Of the unions in this section, the FDA and POA remain TUC members.

Professional, Clerical and Entertainment
Of the unions in this section, Equity, Musicians' Union and Writers' Guild of Great Britain remain TUC affiliates.

General Workers
Of the unions in this section, the GMB remains a TUC affiliate.

Other unions

See also
 List of trade unions in the United Kingdom

Notes

References

Footnotes

Bibliography

External links
 The TUC's list of current affiliates

Affiliates of the Trades Union Congress
Affiliates of the Trades Union Congress
Affiliates of the Trades Union Congress
Trades Union Congress